Robert Bell Alexander Reid (18 November 1936 – 29 July 2000) was a Scottish professional footballer who played as a goalkeeper for Lochee Harp, Downfield, Swansea Town, Arbroath, Dundee United and Raith Rovers.

References

External links
 
 

1936 births
2000 deaths
Scottish footballers
Lochee Harp F.C. players
Downfield F.C. players
Swansea City A.F.C. players
Arbroath F.C. players
Dundee United F.C. players
Raith Rovers F.C. players
Scottish Junior Football Association players
Scottish Football League players
English Football League players
Association football goalkeepers
Footballers from Dundee